Serpent Island is a 1954 adventure film directed by Tom Gries in his directoral debut. Shot in Haiti, the film was produced, written and co-directed by Bert I. Gordon in his film debut. It stars Sonny Tufts and Mary Munday.

Cast
Sonny Tufts as Pete Mason
Mary Munday as Ricki Andre
Tom Monroe as Kirk Ellis
Rosalind Hayes as Ann Christoff
Don Blackman as Jacques

References

External links

1954 films
Films directed by Tom Gries
Films shot in Haiti
Films set on fictional islands
1954 directorial debut films
American adventure films
1954 adventure films
American black-and-white films
1950s English-language films
1950s American films